Simone Kleinsma (born 8 May 1958) is a musical theatre actress in the Netherlands.

Personal life
On 5 June 1990, Simone married Guus Verstraete, a Dutch television director.

Career
Simone provided voice over work to numerous major animated films; including The Fairy Godmother in Shrek 2, Yzma in The Emperor's New Groove, Esmé Holgert in Babe and Babe: Pig in the City, Georgette in Oliver and Company and An American Tail.

Kleinsma performs on regularly base with pianists (most often Cor Bakker or Tony Eyk) or orchestra. As an actress, she became known for her part in the TV-hit series 'Kees & Co' (aired from 1997 to 2006 at RTL Broadcasting). She played Kees Heistee, mother of Anne (Amber Teterissa) and Rudie (Robin Tjon Pian Gi) and married to Ben Heistee (Rik Hoogendoorn).

In 1996–1997 she presented the cooking program 'Koken met Cas'.

Theater

Television
{| class="wikitable"
! Program
! year(s)
! Broadcaster
! remark(s)
|-
| Voorbij, Voorbij (Televisionfilm)
| 1979
|
| Part: Guide
|-
| Spreuken (songs)
| 1979
|
| Singer next to Joost Prinsen
|-
| De Taalstraat: Ik heb u lief mijn Nederlands
| 1979–1982
| Teleac
| Singer with Gerard Cox, Carry Tefsen and Piet Hendriks
|-
| Een vlucht regenwulpen (film)
| 1981
|
| Part: laboratory Janny
|-
| Zeg 'ns Aaa
| Episode 29, 1982
| VARA
| Guestpart: Klushulp
|-
| Zoals U enst, mevrouw
| 1984
| VARA
| Guestpart. Musical comedy with André Hazes, Carry Tefsen, Yvonne Valkenburg en Joost Prinsen
|-
| Als ik later groot ben..!
| 1984
| KRO
| Musical for children because of Childrenbook week 1984. Part: Teacher (next to Marnix Kappers)
|-
| Een avond met André
| 1985
| VARA
| Guest. Muzical show rondom André Hazes
|-
| Wedden, dat..?
| 1986–1987
| AVRO
| Dancer/singer next to Fred Butter, Hans van der Woude & Lucie de Lange. Televisieshow met Jos Brink & Sandra Reemer.
|-
| De Ep Oorklep Show
| 1987
| TROS
| Variety of different parts with André van Duin, Frans van Dusschoten and Lucie de Lange
|-
| Kinderen voor Kinderen 8
| 1987
| VARA
| Hostess/singer with Ron Brandsteder
|-
| Simone & Friends (televisieshow)
| 1988
|
| soloist
|-
| Simone's Kerstshow
| 1990
| RTL 4
| Variety of different parts with André van Duin en Henk Poort
|-
| Gouden televizier Ring Gala 1992
| 1992
| AVRO
| Guest appearance with Paul de Leeuw (as monsieur and madame Thérnadier)
|-
| Mijn dochter en ik
| 1994
| RTL 4
| Guestappearance: Cleaning Lady
|-
| Vrienden voor het leven
| 1994
| RTL 4
| Guest appearance: teacher at pregnancy therapy
|-
| Wat schuift 't?
| 1995
| RTL 4
| Guest appearance: Chantal (Episode Ingepakt en wegwezen)
|-
| 30 minuten
| 1995
| VPRO
| Guest appearance (Afl. 10: Rondom ons). Program written by and starring Arjan Ederveen
|-
| Parodie Parade
| 1996–1997
| RTL 4
| Soloist next to Anne-Mieke Ruyten and Robert Paul. Television show with Ron Brandsteder.
|-
| Koken met Cas
| 1996–1997
| SBS 6
| Hostess (Cookingprogramm with chefcook Cas Spijkers)
|-
| Baantjer
| 2002
| RTL 4
| Guest appearance Annemarie Spijkers/Sandra Kottman (Episode De Cock en het lijk in de kast)
|-
| rowspan="2" | Kees & Co
| 1997–2006
| rowspan="2" | RTL 4
| rowspan="2" | Main part: Kees Heistee (A remake from 2point4 Children).
|-
|2019–2020
|-
| Villa Felderhof
| 2001
| NCRV
| Main guest with André Hazes. Talkshow from and presentes by Rik Felderhof.
|-
| Junior Eurovisiesongfestival
| 2006
| AVRO
| Juror
|-
| In de hoofdrol
| 2008
| AVRO
| Central Guest. Hosted by Frits Sissing
|-
| Dik Voormekaar Show
| 2009
| TROS
| Guest appearance. Television show with André van Duin and Ferry de Groot
|}

Awards
 Pisuisse Award for most promising major student Kleinkunst Academie (1978)
 Academy Award/ Gouden Beelden for Best Comedy actress as Kees Heistee in Kees & Co (1999)
 Golden Harp (2000)
 John Kraaijkamp Musical Award for her part as Donna Stuiveling in the musical Mamma Mia! (2004)
 John Kraaijkamp Musical Award for playing Norma Desmond in the musical Sunset Boulevard (2009)
 John Kraaijkamp Musical Award: Speciale Theater Award for her theatershow Simone: Songs from the Heart'' (2010)
 Nomination John Kraaijkamp Musical Award for Best performance by an actress in a leading role as Roxie Hart in the musical Chicago (2000)
 Nomination John Kraaijkamp Musical Award voor Best performance by an actress in a leading role in Fosse (2003)

Albums

Singles

External links 
 The official Simone Kleinsma fansite

References

1958 births
Living people
Dutch women singers
Dutch musical theatre actresses
Actresses from Amsterdam